This is a list of singles that charted in the top ten of the ARIA Charts in 2007.

Top-ten singles

Key

2006 peaks

2008 peaks

Entries by artist
The following table shows artists who achieved two or more top 10 entries in 2007, including songs that reached their peak in 2006 and 2008. The figures include both main artists and featured artists. The total number of weeks an artist spent in the top ten in 2007 is also shown.

References

Australia Singles top 10
2007 in Australian music
Top 10 singles 2007
Australia 2007